Alberta Virginia Scott (c. 1875 — August 30, 1902) was an American educator. She was the first African-American graduate of Radcliffe College, in 1898.

Early life
Alberta Virginia Scott was born near Richmond, Virginia, and raised in Cambridge, Massachusetts, where her family moved when she was a little girl. Her family were members of the historic Union Baptist Church in Cambridge. Alberta attended Allston School (finishing in 1889) and then Cambridge Latin School, graduating with the class of 1894.

In 1898, Alberta Virginia Scott became the first African-American graduate of Radcliffe College.

Career
Alberta Scott planned for a career in teaching. She taught in Indianapolis and, briefly, at Tuskegee Institute after graduating from Radcliffe.

Personal life
Alberta Scott died in 1902, in Cambridge, aged 26 years after a 16 month illness attributed to overwork and grief after the loss of her father. "Her death cuts off what should have been a useful and creditable life of work among those of her race," concluded the obituary in a Cambridge newspaper.

There is a placard about Alberta V. Scott in Cambridge, placed by the Cambridge African American History Project in 1993. The Association of Black Harvard Women (ABHW) offers an Alberta V. Scott Mentorship Program, named in her honor.

References

External links
Radcliffe College autograph collection: A Finding Aid. Schlesinger Library, Radcliffe Institute, Harvard University.

Radcliffe College alumni
People from Cambridge, Massachusetts
1870s births
1902 deaths
Educators from Virginia
Educators from Massachusetts
Tuskegee University faculty
19th-century American educators
20th-century American educators
People from Richmond, Virginia
19th-century American women educators
20th-century American women educators
American women academics
20th-century African-American women
20th-century African-American people
20th-century African-American educators